The Lycée français Saint Exupéry is a French international school in Ouagadougou, Burkina Faso. 

It serves levels maternelle (preschool) through lycée (senior high school). It was established in 1975. The secondary school is in the centre of the city while the primary school is in proximity to the hôtel Indépendance.

 there are about 125 employees and 1,000 students.

References

External links
 Lycée Saint-Exupéry de Ouagadougou 
 Lycée Saint-Exupéry de Ouagadougou  (Archive)

Buildings and structures in Ouagadougou
International schools in Burkina Faso
French international schools in Africa
Educational institutions established in 1975